Robert Arthur Hanson (R.A.H.) Goodyear (1877 – 24 November 1948) was an English author of children's stories, primarily in a boys' school setting.

Born in Yorkshire, Goodyear attended Archbishop Holgate's Grammar School in Barnsley.  At age seventeen he was first published with a serial in The Boy's Friend periodical.  In his career, he mostly produced popular fiction for boys, as well as sportswriting and guides for writers.

Bibliography
 Forge of Foxenby (1920)
 The Boys of Castle Cliff School (1921)
 The Boys of Tudorville (1921)
 Luckless Leo's Schooldays (1921)
 Tom and Tim at School (1921)
 Two Terms at Linglands (1921)
 The White House Boys (1922)
 The Four Schools (1922)
 The Greenway Heathens (1922)
 Topsy-Turvey Academy (1922)
 The Worst Boy in Town (1922)
 The Captain and the Kings (1923)
 Jack O' Langsett: A Public School Story (1923)
 The Life of the School (1923)
 Tom at Tollbar School (1923)
 The Fifth Form at Beck House (1924)
 Strickland of the Sixth (1928)

References

Further reading 
 
 
 
 
 
 
 

English children's writers
1877 births
1948 deaths
English male poets